Choke is a Canadian punk rock band from Edmonton.

History
With original members Jack Jaggard, Clay Shea, Shawn Moncrieff and Stefan Levasseur, Choke has toured in Canada and the USA.

Choke released their first two albums independently, Lotion in 1995 and Give'er in 1996, which was later released through Smallman Records, who signed the band in 1997. Choke released Needless To Say the following year, an album that was chosen by Exclaim! magazine as one of the top ten punk albums of the year. 1999 saw the release of Foreword. A departure from the skate-punk sound that defined "Needless to Say", "Foreword" was described jokingly by Shea as the "career killer". Despite this, Exclaim! magazine called the album "a tremendous accomplishment by punk standards". Foreword cemented the band's reputation as one of Canada's top punk acts, alongside Propagandhi, Painted Thin, and I Spy.

In 2002, There's A Story To This Moral was released, followed by 2005's Slow Fade Or How I Learned To Question Infinity. The latter was recorded in Vancouver, with Blair Calibaba (Gob, Propagandhi) and Paul Forgues (Slayer, Nine Inch Nails, Treble Charger), and became the fifth release through Smallman Records. The band was heralded by Exclaim! as "...one of the finest technically progressive bands on the planet."

Breakup
In 2007, the band decided to split up after one more tour that would end in Edmonton on June 9. Band members Shawn Moncrieff and Clay Shea started a new band Passenger Action with Ryan Podlubny (ex. The Fullblast, Fordirelifesake) and Allan Harding (ex. Thirty Nights of Violence, Sleeping Girl, and Path of a Logical Liar).

In 2013, the band reunited for one final tour.

In 2022, the band began playing live shows and recorded a new song "Out of Sync".

Band members
 Jack Jaggard – guitar, vocals
 Shawn Moncrieff – guitar, vocals
 Clay Shea – bass guitar, vocals
 Graham Churchill – drums

Discography
 Lotion (1994)
 Give'er (1995)
 Needless to Say (1998)
 Foreword (1999)
 Across the Water (Split with Adhesive, Layaway Plan & Astream) (2001)
 There's a Story to This Moral (2002)
 Slow Fade Or: How I Learned to Question Infinity (2005)
 “Out of Sync “ 2022

See also
List of bands from Canada

References

External links
Choke at Smallman Records website.

Canadian punk rock groups
Musical groups established in 1994
Musical groups disestablished in 2007
Musical groups from Edmonton
1994 establishments in Alberta
2007 disestablishments in Alberta